Blasterjaxx is a Dutch DJ and record production duo composed of Thom Jongkind (born 1990) and Idir Makhlaf (born 1991), originated in The Hague and active since 2010. They are mostly known for producing big room house and electro house music, being more active in the first genre.

History

In 2010, Thom Jongkind, known professionally as Scalix, formed a duo called Blasterjaxx with producer Leon Vielvoije, who left soon after joining. Jongkind then continued under the Blasterjaxx name and started collaborating with Idir Makhlaf, known professionally as Macosta. Makhlaf eventually officially joined Jongkind under the name Blasterjaxx.

In 2012, the Reborn EP was released as a collaboration with D-Rashid, and contained two tracks, "Reborn" and "Where We Go." Dutch EDM producer and DJ, Laidback Luke, signed the tracks to his own label Mixmash Records. In early 2013, the group produced Loud & Proud together with Billy The Kit, with DJ Tiësto subsequently signing the track to his personal record label, Musical Freedom. Blasterjaxx remixed the Tiësto hits "Adagio for Strings" and "Love Comes Again" as well as collaborating with him on a remix of "United," the official anthem of Ultra Music Festival. Blasterjaxx has additional collaboration credits with EDM acts as Dimitri Vegas & Like Mike, David Guetta, Hardwell, Afrojack, Nicky Romero, Quintino, Ibranovski and others.

Blasterjaxx's single "Faith" was a big charting hit in the Netherlands in 2013 and in Sweden in 2014. They subsequently released a collaboration with Hardwell, who edited the track "Fifteen." Blasterjaxx first entered DJ Mag's Top 100 DJs poll at #71 in 2013. 2014 saw the duo reach #13, and #19 in 2015. In June 2015 Blasterjaxx partnered with Electronic Music lifestyle brand Electric Family to produce a collaboration bracelet with 100% of the proceeds being donated to the 20x20x20 Foundation.

In September 2015, Makhlaf announced he was to cease touring, but continue to produce music with Jongkind, citing panic attacks.

Discography

Studio albums

Extended plays

Singles

Remixes

Awards and nominations

DJ Magazine top 100 DJs

References

External links
Official website

Musical groups established in 2010
Musicians from The Hague
Dutch DJs
Dutch record producers
Electro house musicians
Dutch musical duos
Revealed Recordings artists
DJ duos
Electronic dance music duos
Spinnin' Records artists